Ramiro Goben Reducindo Radilla (born 10 February 1979) is a Mexican former professional boxer who competed from 2005 to 2010. As an amateur, he won a gold medal at the 2003 Pan American Games and competed at the 2004 Summer Olympics.

Amateur career
At the 2002 Central American and Caribbean he lost the final to southpaw Shawn Terry Cox from Barbados and won silver.

At the 2003 Pan American Games in Santo Domingo he upset Cuban southpaw Yoan Pablo Hernandez to win gold at light heavyweight.

He participated in the 2004 Summer Olympics for his native country. There he was beaten in the first round of the light heavyweight division by Belarus' eventual runner-up Magomed Aripgadjiev.

Professional career
Reducindo turned pro in the cruiserweight and won his first eight bouts before getting KOd twice, once by Eric Fields.

Professional boxing record

|-
|align="center" colspan=8|13 Wins (8 knockouts, 5 decisions), 4 Losses (4 knockouts, 0 decisions) 
|-
| align="center" style="border-style: none none solid solid; background: #e3e3e3"|Result
| align="center" style="border-style: none none solid solid; background: #e3e3e3"|Record
| align="center" style="border-style: none none solid solid; background: #e3e3e3"|Opponent
| align="center" style="border-style: none none solid solid; background: #e3e3e3"|Type
| align="center" style="border-style: none none solid solid; background: #e3e3e3"|Round
| align="center" style="border-style: none none solid solid; background: #e3e3e3"|Date
| align="center" style="border-style: none none solid solid; background: #e3e3e3"|Location
| align="center" style="border-style: none none solid solid; background: #e3e3e3"|Notes
|-
|Loss
|
|align=left| Saul Montana
|KO
|1
|30/07/2010
|align=left| La Paz, Mexico
|align=left|
|-
|Loss
|
|align=left| Johann Duhaupas
|KO
|1
|05/12/2009
|align=left| Abbeville, France
|align=left|
|-
|Win
|
|align=left| Wilfrido Leal
|KO
|5
|30/05/2009
|align=left| La Paz, Mexico
|align=left|
|-
|Win
|
|align=left| Luis García
|TKO
|1
|14/03/2009
|align=left| La Paz, Mexico
|align=left|
|-
|Win
|
|align=left| Felipe Romero
|UD
|10
|13/09/2008
|align=left| La Paz, Mexico
|align=left|
|-
|Win
|
|align=left| Roberto Ramirez
|TKO
|2
|14/06/2008
|align=left| La Paz, Mexico
|align=left|
|-
|Win
|
|align=left| Felipe Romero
|SD
|12
|28/09/2007
|align=left| La Paz, Mexico
|align=left|
|-
|Loss
|
|align=left| Eric Fields
|KO
|1
|27/07/2007
|align=left| Corona, California, U.S.
|align=left|
|-
|Loss
|
|align=left| Felipe Romero
|KO
|7
|26/05/2007
|align=left| Guerrero Negro, Mexico
|align=left|
|-
|Win
|
|align=left| Eduardo Ayala
|TKO
|7
|16/03/2007
|align=left| La Paz, Mexico
|align=left|
|-
|Win
|
|align=left| José Cruz Rivas
|RTD
|11
|01/12/2006
|align=left| La Paz, Mexico
|align=left|
|-
|Win
|
|align=left| Derek Andrews
|UD
|6
|20/07/2006
|align=left| Los Angeles, California, U.S.
|align=left|
|-
|Win
|
|align=left| José Silva
|KO
|1
|31/03/2006
|align=left| La Paz, Mexico
|align=left|
|-
|Win
|
|align=left| Daniel Cota Peinado
|TKO
|8
|29/10/2005
|align=left| La Paz, Mexico
|align=left|
|-
|Win
|
|align=left| Moses Matovu
|UD
|4
|14/07/2005
|align=left| La Paz, Mexico
|align=left|
|-
|Win
|
|align=left| Javier Castillo
|KO
|1
|14/05/2005
|align=left| La Paz, Mexico
|align=left|
|-
|Win
|
|align=left| Gabriel Taylor
|UD
|4
|10/03/2005
|align=left| San Antonio, Texas, U.S.
|align=left|
|}

External links
Yahoo! Sports
 
 sports-reference

1979 births
Living people
Mexican male boxers
Heavyweight boxers
Cruiserweight boxers
Boxers at the 2003 Pan American Games
Boxers at the 2004 Summer Olympics
Olympic boxers of Mexico
Pan American Games gold medalists for Mexico
Pan American Games medalists in boxing
Central American and Caribbean Games silver medalists for Mexico
Competitors at the 2002 Central American and Caribbean Games
Central American and Caribbean Games medalists in boxing
Medalists at the 2003 Pan American Games
Boxers from Baja California Sur
People from La Paz, Baja California Sur